Ytterdalsgubben is a mountain in Nordenskiöld Land at Spitsbergen, Svalbard. It has a height of 901 m.a.s.l. and is  located between the plain of Lågnesflya and the glacier of Erdmannbreen. Neighbouring mountains are Malmberget and Kosterfjellet. Viewed from the sea, Ytterdalsgubben is a pyramid shaped landmark, and the highest mountain viewed at this part of the coast.

References

Mountains of Spitsbergen